Campeche Island is an island located some 1250 m southeast of the coast of Florianópolis, Brazil. It is located in front of the homonymous beach. It is considered a site of archaeological interest due to paintings found throughout the island.

References 

Atlantic islands of Brazil
Florianópolis
Landforms of Santa Catarina (state)